The Lishui River Bridge is a historic stone bridge over the Lishui River in the town of , Yongjia County, Zhejiang, China.

History
Lishui River Bridge was built in 1558 during the reign of the Jiajing Emperor of the Ming dynasty (1368–1644).

In August 1997, it was classified as a provincial-level cultural heritage site by the Government of Zhejiang.

References

Bridges in Zhejiang
Arch bridges in China
Bridges completed in 1558
Ming dynasty architecture
Buildings and structures completed in 1558
1558 establishments in China